UFC Fight Night: Gustafsson vs. Manuwa (also known as UFC Fight Night 37) was a mixed martial arts event  held on March 8, 2014, at The O2 Arena in London, England. The event was shown live in the UK on Channel 5 and BT Sport and in the United States on UFC Fight Pass.

Background
A bout between Alexander Gustafsson and Jimi Manuwa headlined the event.

UFC President Dana White initially announced that a bout between Gustafsson and Antônio Rogério Nogueira would be headlining the event.  However, just 5 days after the fight was announced news came that Nogueira had to withdraw from the bout due to an injury. Later, reports came that said that Nogueira had never agreed to take the fight against Gustafsson at all.

Ross Pearson was expected to face Melvin Guillard in a rematch at the event. However, Pearson pulled out of the bout citing a knee injury and was replaced by Michael Johnson.

Brad Pickett was expected to make his Flyweight debut against Ian McCall on this card. However, on February 13, it was announced that McCall had pulled out of the bout and was replaced by promotional newcomer Neil Seery.

A bout between Roland Delorme and Davey Grant was cancelled after the weigh ins the day before the event due to Grant suffering a torn meniscus.

Results

Bonus awards
The following fighters were awarded $50,000 bonuses:
 Fight of the Night: Alexander Gustafsson vs. Jimi Manuwa
 Performance of the Night: Alexander Gustafsson and Gunnar Nelson

See also
List of UFC events
2014 in UFC

References

UFC Fight Night
2014 in mixed martial arts
2014 sports events in London
Mixed martial arts in the United Kingdom
Events in London